Hail and Farewell is a 1936 British comedy film directed by Ralph Ince and starring Claude Hulbert.  The film was a quota quickie production, following the escapades of a group of British sailors during six hours' shore leave in Southampton.  More specific plot details are unknown, as there is no evidence of the film being shown after its first run, the British Film Institute has been unable to locate a print for inclusion in the BFI National Archive, and the film is classified as "missing, believed lost".

Cast
 Claude Hulbert as Bert
 Bruce Lester as Peter
 Wally Patch as Sergeant Major
 Reginald Purdell as Nobby
 Joyce Kennedy as Mrs. Harvey
 Nicholas Hannen as Col. Harvey
 Moira Reed as Annie Turner
 Ivan Samson as Col. Oldham
 Henry Caine as Joe Perkins
 Marie Wright as Mrs. Perkins
 Joyce Kirby as Ruby

References

External links
 
 

1936 comedy films
1936 films
British comedy films
1930s English-language films
Films directed by Ralph Ince
Lost British films
Films shot at Teddington Studios
Warner Bros. films
British black-and-white films
1936 lost films
Lost comedy films
1930s British films
English-language comedy films